Taher Gurab City is a rural district (dehestan) in the Central District of Sowme'eh Sara County, Gilan Province, Iran. At the 2006 census, its population was 11,441, in 3,265 families. The rural district has 24 villages.

References 

Rural Districts of Gilan Province
Sowme'eh Sara County